KOLD or Kold may refer to:

 KOLD-FM, a radio station (91.9 FM) licensed to serve Cold Bay, Alaska, United States; see List of radio stations in Alaska
 KOLD-TV, a television station (PSIP channel 13/RF 32) licensed to Tucson, Arizona, United States
 the ICAO code for Old Town Municipal Airport and Seaplane Base, in Old Town, Maine, United States 
 Köld, the third album by the Icelandic metal band Sólstafir